Lofotposten  is a newspaper published in Lofoten, with its headquarters located in Svolvær. It is the biggest publication in Northern Norway.

History and profile
The newspaper was established by Joh. E. Paulsen in 1896. Following the occupation of Norway by Nazis the paper was taken by them in 1941. Since 1995 the newspaper is owned by Amedia. It mainly focuses on the Lofoten area. It had a circulation of 7,133 copies in 2008. Jan Eivind Fredly is the editor.

References

External links
The internet version of the newspaper

1896 establishments in Norway
Amedia
Newspapers published in Norway
Norwegian-language newspapers
Publications established in 1896